The former Province of Eastern Finland in Finland was divided into three regions, 11 districts and 49 municipalities.

North Karelia

Joensuu District
Ilomantsi (Ilomants)
Joensuu
Juuka
Kontiolahti
Liperi
Outokumpu
Polvijärvi
Heinävesi
Central Karelia
Kitee
Rääkkylä
Tohmajärvi
Pielisen Karelia
Lieksa
Nurmes
Valtimo

Northern Savonia

Upper Savonia
Iisalmi
Keitele
Kiuruvesi
Lapinlahti
Pielavesi
Sonkajärvi
Vieremä
Kuopio District
Kuopio
Maaninka
Siilinjärvi
North-Eastern Savonia
Juankoski
Kaavi
Rautavaara
Tuusniemi
Varkaus District
Kangaslampi
Leppävirta
Varkaus
Joroinen
Inner Savonia
Rautalampi
Suonenjoki
Tervo
Vesanto

Southern Savonia

Mikkeli District
Hirvensalmi
Kangasniemi
Mikkeli (St. Michel)
Mäntyharju
Pertunmaa
Ristiina
Puumala
Pieksämäki District
Pieksämäki
Juva
Savonlinna District
Enonkoski
Rantasalmi
Savonlinna (Nyslott)
Sulkava

See also
Municipalities of North Karelia
Municipalities of Northern Savonia
Municipalities of Southern Savonia

Eastern Finland Province